The Yunnan–Haiphong railway ("Indo-China–Yunnan Railroad") is an  railway built by France during 1904–1910, connecting Haiphong, Vietnam, with Kunming, Yunnan province, China. The railway was built with  gauge due to the mountainous terrain along the route. Currently it is the only main line in China using .

History

In the 19th century, the French colonial administration worked to develop regular trading networks and an efficient transport infrastructure between Indochina and south-west China. The primary motivation for such an effort was to facilitate export of European goods to China. A railway would also give France access to Yunnan's natural resources, mineral resources and opium, and open up the Chinese market for Indochinese products such as rice, dry fish, wood and coal.

Before the railway was built, the standard travel time from Haiphong (the closest sea port to most of Yunnan) to Kunming was reckoned by the Western authorities to be 28 days: 16 days by steamer and then a small boat up the Red River to Manhao, and then 12 days overland.

The right to build the railway was obtained following China's defeat in the First Sino-Japanese War (1894–95). At a cost of 95 million francs (€362 million), the railway was among the most ambitious colonial projects undertaken by France, and was put into use on 1 April 1910.

Under pressure from Japan, France closed the line on 16 July 1940 to cut supplies to China during the Second Sino-Japanese War. During the Japanese occupation Japanese National Railways Class 9600 2-8-0 locomotives were shipped to aid their invasion, and after the completion of the "death railway" it was possible for a time to send through traffic to Burma and hence to the Indian  network. This is now not possible, as sections of the railway were destroyed during the conflicts since World War II.

During the Sino-Vietnamese War of 1979, the railway bridge across the Nanxi River at the
two countries' border was destroyed, and the trade between China and Vietnam came to a halt for several years.

Gebishi railway

It was constructed in 1915 and the last  part was closed in 1990.

Present state

Twice-a-week cross-border passenger service operated as late as 2000; the second-class passengers had to transfer from a Chinese train to a Vietnamese train at the border station, while the first-class car passengers could remain on board as their car was transferred to the train across the border. However, landslides caused frequent delays.
Eventually, in 2005
the passenger service on the Chinese section of the railway (the Kunming–Hekou railway) was terminated,
and most of the passenger coaches were donated to Myanmar.

In 2008, passenger service on a small part ( long) of the Chinese section of the railway was resumed, but on a very limited scale. As of 2012, two daily trains ran from Kunming North railway station on the meter-gauge tracks to Shizui (石咀) Station on the western outskirts of Kunming, and to Wangjiaying (王家营) east of the city. As of 2016, this service still continues, with 2 daily trains to Wangjiaying and one to Shizui. In December 2017, in order to leave room for the construction of the Kunming No.4 Metro line, the commuter train service between Shizui and Wangjiaying was terminated again, and parts of the meter gauge railway in the urban area was demolished.

Freight service continues to operate throughout the Kunming–Hekou railway. Some rolling stock continues to be maintained in working condition. According to a 2015 news report, over the seven preceding years, 63 meter gauge flatcars had been refurbished at the Kunming North Station's workshop, for use in transborder container shipping. In 2016, 100 mothballed freight railcars were selected to be refurbished at the Kaiyuan workshop and to be put into use again.

Among important cargo types moved internationally on this line are chemical fertilizers. Since 2015, direct trains have been run from the phosphate fertilizer manufacturers in Kaiyuan to consumers in Vietnam. In the opposite direction, sulphur and zinc ore concentrate are imported to China from Vietnam.

The overall role of the Kunming–Hekou meter-gauge line in the Sino-Vietnamese trade significantly declined in the 21st century, as compared to the railway's heyday in the first half of the 20th century. According to one article dated 2015 and describing the trade as it operated prior to the opening of the standard-gauge railway to Hekou in 2014 (see below), the most common route for cargo shipped from Kunming to Vietnam would be the rather circuitous one: via the Nanning–Kunming railway (opened 1997), the sea port of Fangchenggang, and then by ship to Haiphong. However, since 2015, the amount of transborder shipments on the meter-gauge line has been on the increase again.
According to a 2017 report, the first quarter of 2017 saw 166,200 tons of freight shipped by rail on the transborder line, which represented a 66.2% increase from the same period of the previous year, and 12-year record. This consisted of 74,100 tons of fertilizers exported from China to Vietnam and 92,100 tons of sulphur and zinc ore concentrate imported to China from Vietnam.

On the Vietnamese side, the Hanoi–Haiphong and Hanoi–Lào Cai railways continue to be important for domestic and transborder cargo transportation. Passenger trains continue to run both from Hanoi to Haiphong and from Hanoi to the border town of Lào Cai.

The new Kunming–Hekou railway line

A new  railway line from Kunming toward the Vietnamese border (the Kunming–Yuxi–Hekou railway) has been constructed in several stages between the 1990s and the 2010s. Its first section, a railway branch from Kunming to Yuxi, was opened in 1993. A second daily train was added by July.

The Mengzi–Hekou section was opened in December 2014, and regular passenger service started between Hekou North railway station and Kunming, with some trains continuing to Dali.

Connections to standard-gauge network
There are a few points where the Kunming–Haiphong railway comes into contact with the standard-gauge network, enabling transfer of freight between the narrow-gauge and standard-gauge trains.

In Vietnam, the Hanoi metropolitan area has standard-gauge access via the dual-gauge (meter and standard) line that runs from Hanoi's Gia Lâm railway station to the Chinese (Guangxi) border at Đồng Đăng; this is the line that enables direct standard-gauge connection between Hanoi and China.

At the narrow-gauge railway's northern end, Kunming, is served both by the meter-gauge railway and by standard-gauge railways. There is even a level-crossing between the tracks of different gauges.

A short meter-gauge connector line has been constructed between the new Hekou North railway station (the southern terminal of the new standard-gauge line) and the old meter-gauge railway, thus allowing to bring cargo from Vietnam on meter-gauge railcar for reloading to standard-gauge rolling stock, and vice versa.

A similar connection between the narrow-gauge and standard-gauge network exist in Mengzi, where the narrow-gauge Yuguopo railway station (雨过铺站) on the 
Caoba–Guanjiashan branch is adjacent to the standard-gauge Mengzi North railway station (蒙自北站) on the Kunming–Yuxi–Hekou line.

Museums and memorials

The Yunnan Railway Museum, at Kunming North railway station, has a large exhibit on the Kunming–Haiphong railway and its narrow-gauge branch lines within Yunnan, although it covers the history of the province's standard gauge railways as well.

At Hekou, the square outside of the new Hekou North railway station (opened 2014) is decorated with reliefs depicting the history of the transportation and economy in the region, with a special focus on the Kunming–Haiphong railway.

In fiction
 Bisezhai Station (碧色寨) by Fan Wen (范稳).

See also
 
 Banque de l'Indochine, which financed the railway
 China Railways DFH21 (aka DF10H), main motive power on the railway in the latter quarter of the 20th century
 Ethio-Djibouti Railways, a similar French-designed meter-gauge railway in Africa
 Guangzhouwan
 Hanoi–Haiphong railway
 Hanoi–Lào Cai railway
 History of rail transport in China
 List of former foreign enclaves in China
 Nanning–Kunming Railway (opened 1997), the main modern link between Yunnan and China's ports on the Tonkin Gulf
 Narrow gauge railways in China
 Yunnan–Burma Railway, an abortive project abandoned during World War II

Notes

Further reading

 Altan, Selda (2022). "Politics of Life and Labor: French Colonialism in China and Chinese Coolie Labor During the Construction of the Yunnan–Indochina Railway, 1898–1910". International Labor and Working-Class History.

References

External links
 The Yunnan–Vietnam Railroad
 The Yunnan-Vietnam Railroad – with photographs
 Chemins de Fer de L’Indo-Chine et du Yunnan by Leo-Giuliani 
 Yunnan French Railway Snaps
 Kunming–Hanoi on 1,000 mm gauge
 French Railway In China pdf document
 Kunming–Hekou Railway by K. Yoneya 
 Kunming–Hekou Railway by Mamoru Kuroi 
 Yunnan Railways at kurogane-rail 

China–Vietnam relations
French Indochina
Metre gauge railways in China
Metre gauge railways in Vietnam
Military history of China during World War II
Military history of Vietnam during World War II
Rail transport in Yunnan
Railway lines in China
Railway lines in Vietnam
Railway lines opened in 1910
South-East Asian theatre of World War II